Libertad 1 is a single CubeSat built by the Space Program of the Sergio Arboleda University in Colombia. It is the first Colombian satellite sent to orbit. It was launched aboard a Dnepr rocket on April 17, 2007 from the Baikonur Cosmodrome, Kazakhstan and became the first Colombian satellite to orbit the Earth. It used a telemetric payload to keep it in communication with the University. It was expected to have a 50-day lifespan, however news reports two years after it was launched stated the satellite was still working and sending information, passing over Colombia twice a day.

Team
Team Leader : Raúl A. Joya & Iván Luna Castro
C&DH Developer : Andres Alfonso Caro
COMM & Telemetry  Developer : Cesar Fernando Valero Sepulveda
Attitude Determination : Paul Núñez
PCBs : Miguel Ariza

See also 

List of CubeSats

References

External links
  Libertad 1 Space Program Official Site
 n2yo.com 

Satellites orbiting Earth
Student satellites
Spacecraft launched in 2007
Satellites of Colombia
CubeSats
First artificial satellites of a country
Spacecraft launched by Dnepr rockets